Christian Sjögren (born 10 July 1978) is a retired Swedish ice hockey player. Sjögren was part of the Djurgården Swedish champions' team of 2000 and 2001. Sjögren made 66 Elitserien appearances for Djurgården.

References

External links

1978 births
Djurgårdens IF Hockey players
Living people
Swedish ice hockey players